Vásárosnamény is a district in north-eastern part of Szabolcs-Szatmár-Bereg County. Vásárosnamény is also the name of the town where the district seat is found. The district is located in the Northern Great Plain Statistical Region. This district is a part of Nyírség and Bereg geographical and historical region.

Geography 
Vásárosnamény District borders with the Ukrainian oblast of Zakarpattia to the northeast, Fehérgyarmat District and Mátészalka District to the south, Baktalórántháza District, Kisvárda District and Záhony District to the west. The number of the inhabited places in Vásárosnamény District is 28.

Municipalities 
The district has 2 towns, 1 large village and 25 villages.
(ordered by population, as of 1 January 2013)

The bolded municipalities are cities, italics municipality is large village.

Demographics

In 2011, it had a population of 35,323 and the population density was 57/km².

Ethnicity
Besides the Hungarian majority, the main minorities are the Roma (approx. 5,000) and Ukrainian (150).

Total population (2011 census): 35,323
Ethnic groups (2011 census): Identified themselves: 36,652 persons:
Hungarians: 31,560 (86.11%)
Gypsies: 4,701 (12.83%)
Others and indefinable: 391 (1.07%)
Approx. 1,500 persons in Vásárosnamény District did declare more than one ethnic group at the 2011 census.

Religion
Religious adherence in the county according to 2011 census:

Reformed – 19,834;
Catholic – 7,111 (Roman Catholic – 4,775; Greek Catholic – 2,336);
other religions – 1,006;
Non-religious – 1,576; 
Atheism – 63;
Undeclared – 5,733.

Gallery

See also
List of cities and towns of Hungary

References

External links
 Postal codes of the Vásárosnamény District

Districts in Szabolcs-Szatmár-Bereg County